Xilin Chen is an electrical engineer from the Institute of Computing Technology in Beijing, China.

Chen was named Fellow of the Institute of Electrical and Electronics Engineers (IEEE) in 2016 for his contributions to machine vision for facial image analysis and sign language recognition.
He was elected as an ACM Fellow in 2019 "for contributions to face and sign language recognition and multimedia systems".

References 

Fellow Members of the IEEE
Fellows of the Association for Computing Machinery
Living people
Chinese engineers
Year of birth missing (living people)